Arshad Choudhry (born 15 January 1947) is a Pakistani sailor. He competed in the Finn event at the 1984 Summer Olympics.

References

External links
 

1947 births
Living people
Pakistani male sailors (sport)
Olympic sailors of Pakistan
Sailors at the 1984 Summer Olympics – Finn
Place of birth missing (living people)
20th-century Pakistani people